Alena Shishkova (born 12 November 1992) is a Russian glamour model and beauty queen. She has modeled for glamour photo shoots with Russian men's magazine Maxim, commercial advertising campaigns and walked at fashion shows. She appeared in the Miss Russia 2012 beauty pageant of Russia and was crowned Vice Miss Russia.

Early life
Shishkova was born in Tyumen, the daughter of Nadezhda and Alex Shishkov.  She attended the Institute of Law, Economics and Management at Tyumen State University, specializing in management.

Career
Earlier years she went to a musical school, academic in vocal and guitar. After shooting for "Fashion collection" magazine at the age of 13, she went to beauty contest "Image 2008" and won the title "Miss Hope" and "Miss Dream". In 2009 she got the title "Miss Sunshine". In 2012 she won the title second Vice Miss Russia 2012, 2nd place.

Shishkova has carved out an international glamour modeling career  working around the globe with international representation.

In 2017, Telegram featured Alena in its promotional screenshots of the app under the pseudonym Alena Shy.

Awards and nominations

References

External links 

 
 WhoSay
 Alena Shishkova News

1992 births
Living people
Russian female models